The Castle of Castellar de la Frontera (Spanish: Castillo de Castellar de la Frontera) is a castle located in Castellar de la Frontera, Spain. It was declared Bien de Interés Cultural in 1963.

References 

Castellar de la Frontera
Province of Cádiz
Bien de Interés Cultural landmarks in the Province of Cádiz